Mr. Bill the Conqueror is a 1932 British comedy film directed by Norman Walker and starring Henry Kendall, Heather Angel and Nora Swinburne. It was made by British International Pictures at Elstree Studios.

Cast
 Henry Kendall as Sir William Normand  
 Heather Angel as Rosemary Lannick  
 Nora Swinburne as Diana Trenchard  
 Sam Livesey as Dave Lannick  
 Moore Marriott as Tom Turtle  
 Louise Tinsley as Deborah Turtle  
 Helen Ferrers as Mrs. Priddy  
 Sam Wilkinson as Noah  
 A. Bromley Davenport as Lord Blagden  
 Toni Edgar-Bruce as Lady Blagden  
 David Hawthorne as George Jelby 
 John Burch 
 Lola Duncan 
 Roddy Hughes 
 Quentin McPhearson 
 Anita Sharp-Bolster

References

Bibliography
 Low, Rachael. Filmmaking in 1930s Britain. George Allen & Unwin, 1985.
 Wood, Linda. British Films, 1927-1939. British Film Institute, 1986.

External links

1932 films
British comedy films
1932 comedy films
1930s English-language films
Films shot at British International Pictures Studios
Films directed by Norman Walker
German black-and-white films
1930s British films